The Blue Yonder EZ Flyer is a Canadian-designed-and-built, tandem two-seat, open cockpit, pusher configuration, recreational and training aircraft provided as a completed aircraft or in kit form by Blue Yonder Aviation.

It can be constructed in Canada as a basic ultra-light, an advanced ultra-light or amateur-built aircraft.

Development
The EZ Flyer was the first aircraft design of Wayne Winters of Indus, Alberta. In 1991 Winters set out to design a high performance kit plane that he intended to produce commercially. While considering the design parameters of that proposed aircraft he saw a picture of a Breezy homebuilt and decided instead to design a smaller and lighter aircraft inspired by the Breezy instead. Winter's own past experience flying Ultraflight Lazairs provided the motivation for the design of a slow, easy to handle aircraft with an open cockpit.

Winters designed a new open lattice, "N" girder fuselage constructed from 4130 steel tube along with a new tail to be fitted with wings from the Merlin EZ. The aircraft retained the Junker's ailerons of the Merlin along with the Clark "Y" airfoil that produces docile handling characteristics. The wing also features the Merlin's leading edge "D" cell construction, with foam ribs.

The first prototype of the new design flew in October 1991 and was initially unnamed. Winters allowed several pilots to fly the new design and all remarked on its docile handling, its suitability as a trainer and the ease with which pilots mastered it. As a result, Winters initially named it Easy Flyer and later EZ Flyer (pronounced in the American way as "Eezee Flier").

The EZ Flyer can be equipped with a variety of powerplants, all mounted in pusher configuration:

Rotax 503 
Rotax 582 
Rotax 912 
Rotax 912S

Operational history
The prototype proved robust and easy for students to learn to fly on and has been used since new as a trainer at the Blue Yonder Ultralight Flight School. By May 2001 the prototype had 2500 hours accumulated in student training and showed little signs of wear. Over 30 aircraft have been built for private owners and other flight schools.

In November 2016 there were eight EZ Flyers registered in Canada and eight in the USA.

Operators
 Blue Yonder Aviation – flight school

Specifications (Rotax 582)

See also

References

External links

 Blue Yonder Aviation

Single-engined pusher aircraft
Parasol-wing aircraft
EZ Flyer
1990s Canadian ultralight aircraft
Homebuilt aircraft